Sriram Dalton (born 25 August 1979) is an Indian film producer and director who works in Bollywood. He won the Rajat Kamal award at the 61st National Film Awards.

Filmography
 OP Stop Smelling your Socks (2010)
 The Lost Behrupiya (Won the Best Film Award in Art and Culture at 61st National Film Awards)
 Spring Thunder

Non film work 
In 2018, Sriram started an initiative "Jal Jungle Zamin Humara Hain" for spreading awareness about dying rivers of India with the idea of "Free India Water" Dalton started a walk from Mumbai on 15 May along with supporters. Walks 82 days from Mumbai to Jharkhand, highlighting the issue of commercialization of water and people's rights on land, water and forest.

References

External links
 ShortFilms Stands tall
 Sriram won National Award – BBC

Hindi-language film directors
1979 births
Living people